Domingo de Ulloa, O.P. (died 1601) was a Roman Catholic prelate who served as Bishop of Michoacán (1598–1601),
Bishop of Popayán (1591–1598),
and Bishop of Nicaragua (1585–1591).

Biography
Domingo de Ulloa was born in Toro, Spain and ordained a priest in the Order of Preachers.
On 4 February 1585, he was appointed during the papacy of Pope Gregory XIII as Bishop of Nicaragua and ordained bishop in 1586 in Spain. On 9 December 1591, he was appointed during the papacy of Pope Gregory XIII as Bishop of Popayán On 3 April 1598, he was appointed during the papacy of Pope Clement VIII as Bishop of Michoacán where he served until his death in 1601.

While bishop, he was the principal consecrator of Antonio Calderón de León, Bishop of Puerto Rico (1597), and Juan de Labrada, Bishop of Cartagena (1597).

References

External links and additional sources
 (for Chronology of Bishops) 
 (for Chronology of Bishops) 
 (for Chronology of Bishops) 
 (for Chronology of Bishops) 
 (for Chronology of Bishops) 
 (for Chronology of Bishops) 

16th-century Roman Catholic bishops in Nicaragua
16th-century Roman Catholic bishops in Mexico
Bishops appointed by Pope Gregory XIII
Bishops appointed by Pope Innocent IX
Bishops appointed by Pope Clement VIII
1601 deaths
Dominican bishops
16th-century Roman Catholic bishops in New Granada
Roman Catholic bishops of León in Nicaragua
Roman Catholic bishops of Popayán